Vedran Janjetović (born 20 August 1987) is a Croatian-born Australian football player.

Club career

Janjetović started his career in the youth ranks at NSWPL club Sydney United before being spotted by Sydney FC and was signed to their Youth League squad alongside fellow young stars Matthew Jurman, Kofi Danning, Rhyan Grant and Anthony Golec. He helped Sydney FC to the inaugural title, making a significant impression on his peers with a number of good performances.

In 2010, he would return to Sydney United being too old to be eligible for a spot in Sydney FC's youth team and was not offered a senior team contract at the club due to an ongoing neurological issue in his right arm which forced him into an extended period on the sidelines. Later that year, Janjetović was loaned out to fellow A-League club Brisbane Roar as injury cover for Griffin McMaster as regular custodian Liam Reddy was out injured, however did not make an appearance for the Roar in his time at the club.

Melbourne Heart
Janjetović joined Melbourne Heart on a two-game loan stint for their Hawaiian Islands Invitational in February 2012. He played against both American club Colorado Rapids and Korean side Busan IPark.

Sydney FC
On 18 June 2012, it was announced that Janjetović had signed a two-year deal with Sydney FC to bolster their goalkeeping ranks. Janjetović trialled for a number of weeks at the club against former Gold Coast United goalkeeper Jerrad Tyson, QPR youth goalkeeper Aaron Lennox and Sutherland goalkeeper Nathan Denham. He eventually won out, impressing Sydney FC's goalkeeping coach Zeljko Kalac and manager Ian Crook. Janjetović was also in talks with the club's new cross-city rivals Western Sydney FC during his trial at Sydney FC but chose to sign with the Sky Blues, stating that his decision came down to the calibre of goalkeeping coach at the club as well as Sydney FC's interest and desire to have him in their squad. He made his Sydney FC debut on 2 December 2012 at Allianz Stadium keeping a clean sheet in Sydney's 0–0 draw with Melbourne Heart.

Western Sydney Wanderers 
On 20 December 2016, it was announced that Janjetović signed an 18-month deal with Western Sydney Wanderers. He would rejoin his former goalkeeping coach Zeljko Kalac, stating that it played a large role in his switch to his former's cross-city rivals. The deal would be finalised the following year when the transfer window opened in January.

Career statistics

CS = Clean Sheets

1 – includes A-League final series statistics
2 – AFC Champions League statistics are included in season commencing during group stages (i.e. ACL 2014 and A-League season 2013–2014 etc.)

Honours
Sydney FC:
 A-League National Youth League Premiers: 2008–09
 A-League National Youth League Champions: 2008–09

References

External links
 

1987 births
Living people
Footballers from Zagreb
Croatian emigrants to Australia
Association football goalkeepers
Croatian footballers
Australian soccer players
NK Bjelovar players
Sydney FC players
Brisbane Roar FC players
Melbourne City FC players
Sydney United 58 FC players
Western Sydney Wanderers FC players
First Football League (Croatia) players
A-League Men players